Akram Abdul Ghanee (born 19 March 1987) is a Maldivian professional footballer who plays for New Radiant SC as a defender and captains the Maldives national team.

Honours

Maldives
SAFF Championship: 2018

References

External links
Akram Abdul Ghani at goal.com

Akram Abdul Ghani at maldivesoccer.com

1987 births
Living people
Maldivian footballers
Maldives international footballers
Club Valencia players
New Radiant S.C. players
Victory Sports Club players
Association football defenders
Association football midfielders
Footballers at the 2006 Asian Games
Footballers at the 2010 Asian Games
Asian Games competitors for the Maldives